Hearne Independent School District is a public school district based in Hearne, Texas (US).

The Education Agency reversed its own order to remove the entire board of trustees and superintendent and instead appoint a full-time TEA conservator.

In 2018, the Texas Education Agency rated the school district 'F' for failing.

Schools
Hearne High (Grades 9-12)
Hearne Junior High (Grades 7-8)
Hearne Elementary (Grades PK-6)

References

External links
Hearne ISD

School districts in Robertson County, Texas